The Montejurra incidents, was a neo-fascist terrorist attack that took place on May 9, 1976, when two Carlist members were killed and another three seriously wounded by right-wing gunmen at the annual Carlist Party celebration that was held in Montejurra, Navarre, Spain.

The incidents 
The Carlists, a counter-revolutionary monarchist movement that joined the alliance of Nationalists supporting Franco in the Spanish Civil War (1936-1939), had split between its more traditional, counter-revolutionary, Ancien Régime, Catholic, anti-capitalistic, anti-socialistic, pro-legitimate monarchist adherents and the new confederal, socialist, autogestionary movement with similarities to Titoist ideology.

The new 'Titoist' half of the movement was the target of a violent incident organized by Franco's supporters, informally known as the bunker, who still controlled the State apparatus. Ricardo García Pellejero and Aniano Jiménez Santo, two supporters of Carlist pretender Carlos-Hugo de Borbón-Parma, were murdered by far-right gunmen. At the time of the events, the British magazine The Economist speculated about possible Government involvement in the events:

The region is so tightly policed that opposition parties find it difficult to hold even small private meetings. Yet somehow on a hilltop surrounded by civil guards, more than 50 gunmen could establish themselves for 24 hours, set up an ambush, open fire and make their getaway without attracting official attention.

Among the alleged perpetrators of the crime were Stefano Delle Chiaie, a neofascist Italian; and 15 former members of the Argentine Anticommunist Alliance (Triple A), including Rodolfo Almirón (who, 1983, was revealed to be chief of personal security for Manuel Fraga, Interior Minister in Spain). The public outcry at this report forced Fraga to dismiss Almirón. Jean Pierre Cherid, former member of the French OAS and then of the paramilitary Batallón Vasco Español and Spanish GAL death squads, was also present.

The Spanish intelligence agency SECED brought far-right members to the Montejurra celebrations, while other extremist organizations, such as the Guerrilleros de Cristo Rey, Fuerza Nueva, and others contacted members of the Italian International Fascists and of the Triple A. Augusto Cauchi would be later involved in the 1980 Bologna massacre, in which 85 people died in the bombing and more than 200 were wounded.

There were some claims that the attack was organized with the help of Carlos-Hugo's younger brother, Sixto Enrique de Borbón. He opposed Carlos Hugo's alteration of Carlism from an ultra-traditionalist political movement into a socialist movement. It is commonly accepted  that high-rank Guardia Civil officials, as well as the SECED (CESID's predecessor), supported the conspiracy (code-named Operación Reconquista). Founded by Carrero Blanco, SECED was directed at the time by General Juan Valverde. According to some historians, funding was provided by Antonio María de Oriol de Urquijo, one of the leaders of the far right-wing Carlists.

According to the memoirs of General Sáenz de Santa María, the conspiracy was organized in the office of General Juan Campano, the general director of the Guardia Civil. Sáenz de Santamaría said that Campano stated that Arias Navarro, the Prime Minister, and Fraga, the minister of Interior, approved the operation.

Although the murders took place in close proximity to security forces, they did not arrest anyone nor seize weapons. There was photographic evidence of one of the right-wing terrorists taking part in the shootings, but he was not brought to trial.

Consequences 
Under pressure from the Carlist Party, the government indicted two Spanish citizens, José Luis Marín García Verde and Hermenegildo García Llorente, for murder. The government released them without trial as part of a blanket amnesty for political prisoners in March 1977.

On November 11, 2003, after various failures, one of the Carlist Party's motions led to the Spanish high court ruling that the two dead Carlists were victims of terrorism. This enabled their families to claim compensation from the Spanish Government.

On behalf of the victims, in January 2007 Spanish lawyer José Angel Pérez Nievas pressed charges against Rodolfo Almirón, leader of the Triple A, saying he should be tried for his alleged actions during the Montejurra events. He had been apprehended in Spain in December 2006, following an arrest warrant for charges of murder and an extradition request issued by a judge in Argentina. While Almirón was returned to Argentina, he suffered a stroke and was unable to represent himself at trial. It was suspended and he was kept in jail in detention. He died in 2009.

See also
 List of right-wing terrorist attacks
Carlism
Ezeiza massacre 
Operation Gladio

References

Further reading 
 Onrubia Revuelta, Javier (et al.). Montejurra: 1976-2006. Biblioteca popular carlista, 13. Moraleja de Enmedio: Arcos Ediciones, 2006. 
 Llopis de la Torre, Felipe. Montejurra: tradición contra revolución. Buenos Aires: Editorial Rioplatense, 1976. 
 Clemente, José Carlos, and Carles S. Costa. Montejurra 76: encrucijada politica. Barcelona: Editorial La Gaya Ciencia, 1976.

External links
Crimenes de Montejurra 1976 
"Montejurra: La Operación Reconquista y el acta fundacional de las tramas antiterroristas" 
Sixto Enrique de Borbón's statements on the events 
Montejurra 76 "Un intento de interpretación" 
 Informe Montejurra (1996 edition)
Montejurra mountain 

1976 in Spain
Carlism
Deaths by firearm in Spain
Conflicts in 1976
Terrorist incidents in Spain
May 1976 events in Europe
Far-right terrorism in Spain
1976 crimes in Spain
Terrorist incidents in Spain in 1976
Massacres in Spain